The 2015–16 South Dakota State Jackrabbits men's basketball team represented South Dakota State University during the 2015–16 NCAA Division I men's basketball season. The Jackrabbits, led by 21st year head coach Scott Nagy, played their home games at Frost Arena and were members of the Summit League. The Jackrabbits finished the season 26–8, 12–4 in Summit League play to share the Summit League regular season championship. They defeated Oral Roberts, Denver, and North Dakota State to win the Summit League tournament. As a result, they received the conference's automatic bid to the NCAA tournament. As a No. 12 seed in the South Region, they were eliminated by No. 5 seed Maryland in the first round.

On April 4, head coach Scott Nagy resigned to become the head coach at Wright State. He finished at South Dakota State with a 21-year record of 410–240. On April 13, the school hired T. J. Otzelberger as head coach.

Previous season 
The Jackrabbits finished the 2014–15 season 24–11, 12–4 in Summit League play to win a share of the Summit League regular season championship. They lost to North Dakota State in the finals of the Summit League tournament. As a No. 1 seed in a conference tournament who did not win their tournament, they received an automatic bid to the NIT where they lost in the second round to Vanderbilt.

Roster

Schedule

|-
!colspan=9 style="background:#003896; color:#F7D417;"| Exhibition

|-
!colspan=9 style="background:#003896; color:#F7D417;"| Regular season

|-
!colspan=9 style="background:#003896; color:#F7D417;"| The Summit League tournament

|-
!colspan=9 style="background:#003896; color:#F7D417;"|NCAA tournament

References

South Dakota State Jackrabbits men's basketball seasons
South Dakota State
South Dakota State
2015 in sports in South Dakota
2016 in sports in South Dakota